The 2013 season of the Esiliiga, the second level in the Estonian football system, is the twenty-third season in the league's history. The season officially began on 3 March 2013 and ended on 10 November 2013. However, on 3 March the Estonian Football Association announced that all matches scheduled for 3 March 2013 would be postponed due to heavy snowfall. The previous league champions Infonet were promoted to Meistriliiga while Pärnu Linnameeskond and Kohtla-Järve Lootus were relegated to Esiliiga B division. For this season those three teams are replaced by Jõhvi Lokomotiv from II Liiga East/North division and Viljandi Tulevik and Vändra Vaprus from II Liiga West/South division.

Teams

Stadiums and locations

Personnel and kits
Note: Flags indicate national team as has been defined under FIFA eligibility rules. Players and Managers may hold more than one non-FIFA nationality.

Managerial changes

League table

Promotion play-off
At season's end, the runners-up of the 2013 Esiliiga will participate in a two-legged play-off with the 9th place club of the 2013 Meistriliiga for the spot in next year's competition.

Relegation play-off
At season's end, the 8th place club of the 2013 Esiliiga will participate in a two-legged play-off with the 3rd place club of the 2013 Esiliiga B for the spot in next year's competition.

Season statistics

Top goalscorers

Awards

See also
 2013 Meistriliiga
 2013 Esiliiga B
 2012–13 Estonian Cup
 2013–14 Estonian Cup

References

Esiliiga seasons
2
Estonia
Estonia